Rivoli is a comune (municipality) established around the 1st century CE, in the Metropolitan City of Turin in the Italian region Piedmont, about  west of Turin. As of 1-1-2017, it had a population of 48,798.

Rivoli borders the following municipalities: Turin, Pianezza, Caselette, Alpignano, Collegno, Rosta, Grugliasco, Villarbasse, Rivalta di Torino, Orbassano.

History
Although unproven by archaeological and historical sources, it is thought that before the Roman conquest the area of Rivoli was inhabited by the Taurini, a tribe of the Ligures, who, after the 4th century BC, were most likely joined by a Celtic migration from what is today southern France. The Romans conquered the area in 221 BC.

The first findings are from the 1st and 2nd century CE, belonging to Roman sepultures.

Main sights
The Castle of Rivoli, an unfinished residence of the Royal House of Savoy, currently houses a museum of contemporary art.

Other sights include:
 14th-century house, called Casa del Conte Verde (English: "The Green Count's house")
 Palazzo Piozzo
 Villa Colla park
 La Maison Musique, a former slaughterhouse
 Piazza Martiri, the main  square and a meeting point during the winter when a skating rink is built.

Twin towns - sister cities
Rivoli is twinned with:
 Mollet del Vallès, Spain
 Ravensburg, Germany
 Kranj, Slovenia
 Montélimar, France

People

 Fabio Basile (born 1994), judoka
 Charles Emmanuel I, Duke of Savoy (1562–1630), Duke of Savoy
 Federico Gatti (born 1998), professional football player
 Rita Grande (born 1975), tennis player
 Mina Leonesi (c. 1890 – c. 1930), opera singer and actress
 Anthony Neyrot (1425–1460), Catholic martyr and beatus
 Victor Amadeus II of Sardinia (1666–1732), King of Sicily and Sardinia

References

External links
 Official website